Jeszenszky is a Hungarian language surname. It may refer to:
Members of two Hungarian  noble families House of Jeszenszky
Béla Tibor Jeszenszky (1962–2008), Hungarian singer
 Ferenc Jeszenszky (1905–1990), Hungarian economist, during 1949–52 was a president of the Hungarian National Bank
 Géza Jeszenszky (born 1941), Hungarian politician, in 1990–94 foreign minister of Hungary

Hungarian-language surnames